The European Beach Volleyball Championship (or the Nestea European Championship Final) is a unisex sport competition for national teams in the sport of beach volleyball. The championship is held annually by the CEV (the European volleyball federation).

Editions
Initially, in 1993, just men competed, but the following year a separate championship was held for women. The events have been combined since 1995.

‡ : As part of the 2022 European Championships

Results Summary

Men's

Women's

Medals
As of 2022 European Beach Volleyball Championships.

Men's

Women's

Total

See also
 World Beach Volleyball Championships
 Asian Beach Volleyball Championships

References
 BVB Info
 Sports123

 
European volleyball records and statistics
Recurring sporting events established in 1993
Beach volleyball competitions
European championships